Jordan Aboudou (born January 30, 1991) is a French professional basketball player who plays for DUC of the Nationale 1 and the Basketball Africa League (BAL). He is a 2.01 m (6 ft 7 in) tall small forward.

Professional career
From 2009 to 2014, Aboudou played for Élan Chalon. In the 2011–12 season, he won the national French championship with Chalon.

In June 2014, he signed with BCM Gravelines. Aboudou played for Gravelines for two seasons.

On August 8, 2016, Aboudou signed with AS Monaco Basket for the 2016–17 season.

On December 13, 2017, Aboudou signed with Fos Provence Basket.

On January 9, 2020, SLUC Nancy Basket summonsed Aboudou, and subsequently by mutual agreement on 18 February, the contract was terminated.

On 28 February, 2020, Aboudou signed a contract with Vichy-Clermont of the LNB Pro B.

On March 3, 2022, Aboudou was announced to be on the roster of the Senegalese club DUC for the 2022 season of the Basketball Africa League (BAL).

BAL career statistics

|-
| style="text-align:left;"|2022
| style="text-align:left;"|DUC
| 4 || 2 || 15.0 || .412 || .286 || .500 || 4.5 || 1.0 || 0.0 || 0.2 || 5.3
|-
|- class="sortbottom"
| style="text-align:center;" colspan="2"|Career
| 4 || 2 || 15.0 || .412 || .286 || .500 || 4.5 || 1.0 || 0.0 || 0.2 || 5.3

References

External links
 Euroleague.net Profile
 LNB League Profile

1991 births
Living people
DUC Dakar players
Sportspeople from Colombes
AS Monaco Basket players
BCM Gravelines players
Élan Chalon players
Fos Provence Basket players
French men's basketball players
Small forwards
SLUC Nancy Basket players
French expatriate basketball people in Senegal
Black French sportspeople